Moran Mor Paul II Peter Meouchi (born April 1, 1894, Jezzine, Lebanon – died on January 11, 1975, Bkerké, Lebanon), (or Boulos Boutros el-Meouchi, Meoushi) was the 74th Maronite Patriarch of Antioch from 1955 until his death in 1975 and a cardinal of the Catholic Church.

Life

Moran Mor Paul Peter Meouchi was born in Jezzine, Lebanon on April 1, 1894. His studied at the College de la Sagesse in Ashrafieh, a district of Beirut and later in Rome in the Pontifical Urban University and at the Pontifical Gregorian University.

He was ordinated priest in Rome on December 7, 1917, and served as secretary of the Maronite bishops of Saida and of Tyre. After having attended a visitation of the bishop of Tyre in the United States in 1920, he remained in the United States till 1934, serving the Maronite communities particularly in Indiana, Connecticut and California.

He was elected Maronite bishop of Tyre on April 29, 1934, and consecrated on December 8, 1934, at Bkerké by Maronite Patriarch of Antioch, Anthony Peter Arida. His co-consecrators were Augustin Bostani, Eparch of Sidon, and Pierre Feghali, Titular bishop of Epiphania in Syria. He chose as episcopal motto Gloria Libani data est ei.

Moran Mor Paul Peter Meouchi was elected patriarch of Antioch of the Maronites on May 25, 1955. He attended the I, II and III sessions of the Second Vatican Council, 1962–1965, where he took a stand to defend the rights of Patriarchs to discourage the emigration of Christians from the Middle East. On February 22, 1965, he was created Cardinal by Pope Paul VI, being the first Maronite to become cardinal. He was elevated - as usual of Eastern Catholic Patriarchs, as a result of the motu proprio Ad purpuratorum patrum collegium - to the rank of cardinal-bishop without granting a suburbicarian diocese.

Paul Peter Meouchi was from 1969 until his death chairman of the Synod of the Maronite Church and from 1970 until his death chairman of the Assembly of Catholic Patriarchs and Bishops in Lebanon.

From a political point of view, his action as Patriarch of the Maronite was intended to promote the reconciliation among all the Lebanese, both Christians and Muslims. , thus standing in opposition to the pro-USA former president of Lebanon Camille Chamoun.

He died on January 11, 1975, in the Maronite Catholic Patriarchate in Bkerké, Lebanon, where he was buried.

See also

List of Maronite Patriarchs
Maronite Church

Sources

 Code, Joseph Bernard (1964). Dictionary of the American Hierarchy (1789-1964). New York: Joseph F. Wagner. pp. 200–201.

Notes

External links
 http://www.gcatholic.org/dioceses/diocese/tyrz1.htm
 http://www.araldicavaticana.com/apmeouchi_paolo_pietro.htm

1894 births
1975 deaths
Lebanese religious leaders
Lebanese cardinals
Lebanese Maronites
Maronite Patriarchs of Antioch
People from South Lebanon
Participants in the Second Vatican Council
Cardinals created by Pope Paul VI